Tibor Takács is a Hungarian sprint canoeist who competed in the mid-1990s. He won two gold medals in the C-4 1000 m event at the ICF Canoe Sprint World Championships, earning them in 1993 and 1994.

References

Hungarian male canoeists
Living people
Year of birth missing (living people)
ICF Canoe Sprint World Championships medalists in Canadian
20th-century Hungarian people